Joseph Henrich (born 1968) is an American professor of human evolutionary biology at Harvard University. Before arriving at Harvard, Henrich was a professor of psychology and economics at the University of British Columbia. He is interested in the question of how humans evolved from "being a relatively unremarkable primate a few million years ago to the most successful species on the globe", and how culture shaped our species' genetic evolution.

Biography
Henrich holds bachelor degrees in anthropology and aerospace engineering from the University of Notre Dame, earned in 1991. From 1991 to 1993, he worked as a Test and Evaluation Systems Engineer for General Electric Aerospace (sold to Martin Marietta in 1993) in Springfield, Virginia. In 1995, he earned a master's degree and four years later, a doctorate in anthropology from the University of California at Los Angeles.

From 2002 to 2007, Henrich was on the faculty of Emory University in the Department of Anthropology. He became then the Canada Research Chair in Culture, Cognition and Coevolution at the University of British Columbia, where he was a professor in the departments of psychology and economics. In 2015, he was named Professor and Chair of the Department of Human Evolutionary Biology at Harvard University.

Henrich is a recipient of the 2003 Presidential Early Career Award for Scientists and Engineers and the 2022 Hayek Prize.

Research
Henrich's research areas include cultural learning, the evolution of cooperation, social stratification, prestige, technological change, economic decision-making, and the evolution of monogamous marriage and religion. Early in his career, Henrich led teams of anthropologists and economists in conducting behavioral experiments to test the foundations of game theory in diverse societies around the world. This body of research demonstrated that not only did the predictions of standard game theory, rooted in canonical assumptions of self-interest, fail across a diverse range of human societies, but that it failed in different ways in different places.

Henrich's research on the origins and evolution of religions argues that the beliefs, rituals, and devotions that compose religious traditions have been shaped not only by reliably developing features of human minds but also by competition among groups. Intergroup competition would have favored supernatural beliefs and ritual practices that increased within-group cooperation, harmony, or solidarity. Building on the observation that most human societies have permitted polygamy, Henrich has argued that normative monogamy spread culturally because it reduces male-male competition and thereby promotes success in competition with other societies.

Henrich's research has documented, and sought to explain, psychological differences across populations and around the world. This work argues that the most commonly used participants in psychological and behavioral research are not only a single type of population within a global spectrum, but that they are particularly psychologically peculiar. To raise the consciousness of researchers to this issue, Henrich and his collaborators dubbed the populations most commonly tapped for psychological and behavioral research as WEIRD, a backronym that stands for Western, Educated, Industrialized, Rich, and Democratic, and summarizes the background of most participants in psychological research.

Selected publications

Books

References

External links
 

Harvard University faculty
Academic staff of the University of British Columbia
University of California, Los Angeles alumni
University of Notre Dame alumni
Living people
Canada Research Chairs
Cognitive science of religion
American anthropologists
1968 births
Recipients of the Presidential Early Career Award for Scientists and Engineers